Stanka Pavlova (born 24 May 1938) is a Bulgarian gymnast. She competed in six events at the 1960 Summer Olympics.

References

1938 births
Living people
Bulgarian female artistic gymnasts
Olympic gymnasts of Bulgaria
Gymnasts at the 1960 Summer Olympics
Gymnasts from Sofia